A fog bow, sometimes called a white rainbow, is a similar phenomenon to a rainbow; however, as its name suggests, it appears as a bow in fog rather than rain. Because of the very small size of water droplets that cause fog—smaller than —the fog bow has only very weak colors, with a red outer edge and bluish inner edge. The colors fade due to being smeared out by the diffraction effect of the smaller droplets.

In many cases, when the droplets are very small, fog bows appear white, and are therefore sometimes called white rainbows. Along with its larger angular size, this lack of color is a feature of a fog bow that distinguishes it from a glory, which has multiple pale-colored rings caused by diffraction. When droplets forming it are almost all of the same size, the fog bow can have multiple inner rings, or supernumeraries, which are more strongly colored than the main bow.  

A fog bow seen in clouds, typically from an aircraft looking downwards, is called a cloud bow. Mariners sometimes call fog bows sea-dogs.

Direction
A fog bow is seen in the same direction as a rainbow, thus the sun would be behind the head of the observer and the direction of view would be into a bank of fog (which may not be noticeable in directions away from the bow itself). Its outer radius is slightly less than that of a rainbow.

When a fog bow appears at night it is called a lunar fog bow.

See also

Circumhorizontal arc
Circumzenithal arc
Cloud iridescence
Dewbow
Halo
Moonbow
Sun dog

References

External links

Photos and explanation of fogbows at Atmospheric Optics.
Fogbow image gallery at AKM website.
Fogbows at Glows, Bows and Haloes site.

Atmospheric optical phenomena
Atmospheric sciences
Earth phenomena
Rainbow